The British Columbia Democratic Alliance was a political party at the provincial level in the Province of British Columbia, Canada.

It was founded in June 2004 by "individuals who are progressive in their policies, democratic in their principles, and represent an alliance of interests reflecting the future of British Columbia as a strong and equal partner in a united Canada."  Its founders, former supporters of the Progressive Democratic Alliance, had hoped to resuscitate the old party which had been moribund since Gordon Wilson's defection to the NDP.  For financial reasons (the PDA reportedly had $60,000 in bad debts), they instead chose to create a new entity.

The BCDA believed:
 that every individual is equal before and under the law and has the right to the equal protection and equal benefit of the law without discrimination and, in particular, without discrimination based on race, national or ethnic origin, colour, religion, sex, sexual orientation, age or mental or physical disability;
 that all persons are endowed with an inherent worth and dignity; 
 that the role of government is:
 to develop laws to protect the public trust, which is the environment; 
 to provide law and order, which allows social harmony; and 
 to provide comprehensive health care, adequate and effective education, and a social safety net for those who cannot otherwise provide for themselves.

In autumn 2004, the party formed the British Columbia Democratic Coalition with three other small parties: the British Columbia Moderate Democratic Movement, the Citizens Action Party, and Link BC.

On January 15, 2005, the British Columbia Democratic Coalition participated in the founding convention of Democratic Reform British Columbia (DRBC) in which it merged with the Reform Party of British Columbia and All Nations Party of British Columbia.

The DRBC calls itself a "socially progressive, fiscally conservative" centrist political party.

See also
 List of Canadian political parties

References
Democratic Reform BC
Elections BC

Defunct political parties in Canada